Centre was a political party in Norway founded in 1893 and led by Frits Hansen. It positioned itself as a moderate middle party between the Conservative Party and the radical Liberal Party.

History 
Centre was founded by eastern moderates who had been politically homeless since the 1888 Liberal split, and it was often characterised as the Eastern Norway parallel to the Moderate Liberal Party (based in the south-west). While informally known as the "Moderate Party of Eastern Norway", it remained an independent party-organisation despite talks of a possible merger. Their common goal was to work against the Liberals' policy of challenging the union with Sweden, expanding voting rights, and taxes.

Presenting itself as a rural agrarian party with its base among farmers, Centre largely adopted the protectionist program of the Norwegian Agrarian Association from 1895/96. The party was otherwise ideologically closely connected to the conservative Christian section of the folk high school movement. Along with Frits Hansen, an educator himself, another co-founder was the priest and fellow educator Christopher Bruun. In elections the party cooperated with the Conservative Party. After declining support, some members joined the Conservative Party around 1900, and when the Coalition Party was formed in 1903 Centre was absorbed into the alliance.

References

Political parties established in 1893
1893 establishments in Norway
Political parties disestablished in 1903
1903 disestablishments in Norway
Moderate Liberal Party
Nordic agrarian parties
Defunct political parties in Norway
Centrist parties in Norway